This is a list of freshwater ecoregions in Africa and Madagascar, as identified by the World Wildlife Fund (WWF).

The WWF divides the Earth's land surface into ecoregions, defined as "large area[s] of land or water containing a distinct assemblage of natural communities and species". Ecoregions are grouped into bioregions, "a complex of ecoregions that share a similar biogeographic history, and thus often have strong affinities at higher taxonomic levels (e.g. genera, families)." The Earth's land surface is divided into eight biogeographic realms. Most of Africa lies in the Afrotropical realm, although the freshwater ecoregions of North Africa have much in common with the Palearctic.

Each ecoregion is also classified into major habitat types, or biomes.

Many consider this classification to be quite decisive, and some propose these as stable borders for bioregional democracy initiatives.

by Bioregion

North African
 Canary Islands
 Horn (Djibouti, Ethiopia, Somalia)
 Permanent Maghreb (Algeria, Mauritania, Morocco, Tunisia, Western Sahara)
 Temporary Maghreb (Algeria, Egypt, Libya, Mauritania, Morocco, Tunisia, Western Sahara)
 Red Sea Coastal (Egypt, Eritrea, Ethiopia, Sudan)
 Socotra (Yemen)

Nilo-Sudan
 Ashanti (Côte d'Ivoire, Ghana)
 Bight Coastal (Benin, Ghana, Nigeria, Togo)
 Bijagos (Guinea Bissau)
 Cape Verde
 Dry Sahel (Algeria, Chad, Egypt, Libya, Mali, Mauritania, Niger, Sudan, Western Sahara)
 Eburneo (Burkina Faso, Côte d'Ivoire, Mali)
 Ethiopian Highlands (Ethiopia)
 Lake Chad Catchment (Cameroon, Central African Republic, Chad, Nigeria, Sudan)
Yaéré (seasonal wetland)
 Niger
 Upper Niger (Côte d'Ivoire, Guinea, Mali)
 Inner Niger Delta (Mali)
 Lower Niger-Benue (Benin, Burkina Faso, Mali, Niger, Nigeria)
 Niger Delta (Nigeria)
 Nile
 Lake Tana (Ethiopia)
 Upper Nile (Sudan, Uganda)
 Lower Nile (Egypt, Sudan)
 Nile Delta (Egypt)
 Northern Eastern Rift (Ethiopia)
 Senegal-Gambia Catchments (Gambia, Guinea, Guinea Bissau, Mali, Mauritania, Senegal)
 Shebele-Juba Catchments (Ethiopia, Kenya, Somalia)
 Lake Turkana (Ethiopia, Kenya)
 Volta (Burkina Faso, Côte d'Ivoire, Ghana, Togo)

Upper Guinea
 Fouta-Djalon (Guinea)
 Mount Nimba (Côte d'Ivoire, Guinea, Liberia)
 Northern Upper Guinea (Guinea, Guinea Bissau, Liberia, Sierra Leone)
 Southern Upper Guinea (Côte d'Ivoire, Guinea, Liberia)

West Coast Equatorial
 Central West Coastal Equatorial (Cameroon, Republic of the Congo, Equatorial Guinea, Gabon)
 Northern West Coast Equatorial (Cameroon, Equatorial Guinea, Nigeria)
 Southern West Coast Equatorial (Angola, Democratic Republic of the Congo, Republic of the Congo, Gabon)
 São Tomé, Príncipe, and Annobón (Equatorial Guinea, São Tomé and Príncipe)
 Western Equatorial Crater Lakes (Cameroon)

Congo
 Albertine Highlands (Democratic Republic of the Congo)
 Bangweulu-Mweru (Democratic Republic of the Congo, Zambia)
 Cuvette Centrale (Democratic Republic of the Congo)
 Kasai (Angola, Democratic Republic of the Congo)
 Lower Congo (Angola, Democratic Republic of the Congo, Republic of the Congo)
 Lower Congo Rapids (Democratic Republic of the Congo, Republic of the Congo)
 Mai-Ndombe (Democratic Republic of the Congo)
 Malebo Pool (Democratic Republic of the Congo)
 Sangha (Cameroon, Central African Republic, Republic of the Congo)
 Sudanic Congo (Oubangi) (Central African Republic, Democratic Republic of the Congo, Republic of the Congo)
 Uele (Democratic Republic of the Congo)
 Upper Congo (Democratic Republic of the Congo)
 Upper Congo Rapids (Democratic Republic of the Congo)
 Upper Luluaba (Democratic Republic of the Congo)
 Thysville Caves (Democratic Republic of the Congo)
 Tumba (Democratic Republic of the Congo)

Great Lakes
 Lake Malawi (Malawi, Mozambique, Tanzania)
 Lake Rukwa (Tanzania)
 Lake Tanganyika (Burundi, Democratic Republic of the Congo, Rwanda, Tanzania, Zambia)
 Lakes Kivu, Edward, George, and Victoria (Burundi, Democratic Republic of the Congo, Kenya, Tanzania, Uganda)

Eastern and Coastal
 Southern Eastern Rift (Kenya, Tanzania)
 Kenyan Coastal Rivers (Kenya)
 Pangani (Kenya, Tanzania)
 Malagarasi-Moyowosi (Tanzania)
 Eastern Coastal Basins (Mozambique, Tanzania)
 Lakes Chilwa and Chiuta (Malawi, Mozambique)

Cuanza
 Cuanza (Angola)

Zambezi
 Etosha (Angola, Namibia)
 Kalahari (Botswana, Namibia, South Africa)
 Karstveld Sink Holes (Namibia)
 Namib Coastal (Angola, Namibia)
 Okavango Floodplains (Angola, Botswana, Namibia)
 Zambezian Lowveld (Mozambique, South Africa, Eswatini, Zimbabwe)
 Zambezi
 Zambezian Headwaters (Angola, Zambia)
 Kafue (Zambia)
 Upper Zambezi Floodplains (Angola, Botswana, Namibia, Zambia)
 Mulanje (Malawi, Mozambique)
 Eastern Zimbabwe Highlands (Mozambique, Zimbabwe)
 Zambezian (Plateau) Highveld (Zimbabwe)
 Middle Zambezi Luangwa (Mozambique, Zambia, Zimbabwe)
 Lower Zambezi (Malawi, Mozambique)

Madagascar and the Indian Ocean Islands
 Comoros
 Madagascar Eastern Lowlands (Madagascar)
 Madagascar Eastern Highlands (Madagascar)
 Madagascar Northwestern Basins (Madagascar)
 Madagascar Southern Basins (Madagascar)
 Madagascar Western Basins (Madagascar)
 Mascarenes (Mauritius, Réunion)
 Coralline Seychelles (Seychelles)
 Granitic Seychelles (Seychelles)

Southern Temperate
 Amatole-Winterberg Highlands (South Africa)
 Cape Fold (South Africa)
 Drakensberg-Maloti Highlands (Lesotho, South Africa)
 Karoo (South Africa)
 Southern Kalahari (South Africa)
 Southern Temperate Highveld (South Africa, Eswatini)
 Western Orange (Botswana, South Africa)

by Major Habitat type

Closed basins and small lakes
 Lakes Chilwa and Chiuta
 Southern Eastern Rift
 Lake Tana
 Northern Eastern Rift
 Western Equatorial Crater Lakes

Floodplains, swamps, and lakes
 Bangweulu-Mweru
 Inner Niger Delta
 Kafue
 Lake Chad Catchment
 Mai Ndombe
 Malagarasi-Moyowosi
 Okavango Floodplains
 Tumba
 Upper Luluaba
 Upper Nile
 Upper Zambezi Floodplains
 Yaéré

Moist forest rivers
 Ashanti
 Cuvette Centrale
 Central West Coastal Equatorial
 Eburneo
 Kasai
 Lower Congo
 Madagascar Eastern Lowlands
 Malebo Pool
 Northern Upper Guinea
 Northern West Coast Equatorial
 Sangha
 Southern Upper Guinea
 Northern West Coastal Equatorial
 Sudanic Congo (Oubangi)
 Upper Congo
 Upper Niger

Mediterranean systems
 Cape Fold
 Permanent Maghreb

Highland and mountain systems
 Albertine Highlands
 Amatole-Winterberg Highlands
 Drakensberg-Maloti Highlands
 Eastern Zimbabwe Highlands
 Ethiopian Highlands
 Fouta-Djalon
 Madagascar Eastern Highlands
 Mount Nimba
 Mulanje

Island rivers and lakes
 Bijagos
 Canary Islands
 Cape Verde
 Comoros
 Coralline Seychelles
 Granitic Seychelles
 São Tomé, Príncipe, and Annobón
 Mascarenes
 Socotra

Large lakes
 Lake Malawi
 Lake Rukwa
 Lake Tanganyika
 Lake Turkana
 Lakes Kivu, Edward, George, and Victoria

Large river deltas
 Niger Delta
 Nile Delta

Large river rapids
 Lower Congo Rapids
 Upper Congo Rapids

Savanna-dry forest rivers
 Bight Coastal
 Cuanza
 Kenyan Coastal Rivers
 Lower Niger-Benue
 Lower Zambezi
 Madagascar Northwestern Basins
 Madagascar Western Basins
 Middle Zambezi Luangwa
 Pangani
 Senegal-Gambia Catchments
 Eastern Coastal Basins
 Southern Temperate Highveld
 Uele
 Volta
 Zambezian Headwaters
 Zambezian Lowveld
 Zamebzian (Plateau) Highveld

Subterranean and spring systems
 Karstveld Sink Holes
 Thysville Caves

Xeric systems
 Dry Sahel
 Etosha
 Horn
 Kalahari
 Karoo
 Lower Nile
 Madagascar Southern Basins
 Namib Coastal
 Red Sea Coastal
 Shebele-Juba Catchments
 Southern Kalahari
 Temporary Maghreb
 Western Orange

References
 Thieme, Michelle L. (2005). Freshwater Ecoregions of Africa and Madagascar: A Conservation Assessment. Island Press, Washington DC.

 01
.Freshwater
.
Aquatic ecology
Africa, Freshwater
Ecoregions, Freshwater
Ecoregions, Freshwater